Damien Moulin (born 3 January 1987) is a French professional footballer who currently plays as a defender for FC Côte Bleue.

Career
After a long career playing amateur football (including 147 leagues matches in Championnat National), Moulin signed a professional contract with FC Istres in 2012.

References

Damien Moulin career statistics at foot-national.com

1987 births
Living people
Sportspeople from Nièvre
French footballers
Association football defenders
AS Saint-Étienne players
Louhans-Cuiseaux FC players
ÉFC Fréjus Saint-Raphaël players
Vannes OC players
FC Istres players
FC Mulhouse players
FC Annecy players
Ligue 2 players
Championnat National players
Footballers from Bourgogne-Franche-Comté